Panama competed at the 2011 Pan American Games in Guadalajara, Mexico from October 14 to 30, 2011, but its athletics team, including defending gold medalist Irving Saladino, did not compete because the Panama athletics association has had issues with the Panama Olympic Committee. Panama sent 48 athletes in 13 sports.

Medalists

Baseball

Panama qualified a baseball team of twenty-three athletes to participate.

Team

Alberto Acosta
Abraham Atencio
Euclides Bethancourt
Jorge Bishop
Javier Castillo
Yeliar Castro
Angel Chavez
Gustavo Gomez
David Gonzalez
Gustavo Gonzalez
Saul Gonzalez
Luis Machuca
José Macías
Gilberto Mendez
Francis Moreno
Carlos Munoz
Eliecer Navarro
Jeffer Patino
Cesar Quintero
Carlos Quiroz
Adolfo Rivera
Concepción Rodriguez
Jonathan Vega

Group A

Seventh place match

Bowling

Panama qualified two male athletes in the bowling competition.

Men
Individual

Pairs

Boxing

Men

Equestrian

Jumping
Individual

Fencing

Women

Karate

Panama qualified one athlete in the 61 kg women's category.

Modern pentathlon

Panama qualified two male pentathletes.

Men

Shooting

Men

Women

Swimming

Men

Taekwondo

Panama qualified one athlete in the 58 kg men's category and one athlete in the 49 kg women's category.

Men

Women

Triathlon

Men

Weightlifting

Wrestling

Panama qualified one athlete in the 84 kg men's freestyle category, one athlete in the 74 kg men's Greco-Roman category, and one athlete in the 72 kg women's category.

Men
Freestyle

Greco-Roman

Women
Freestyle

References

Nations at the 2011 Pan American Games
P
2011